This is a list of seasons completed by the Northwestern Wildcats men's basketball program since the team's inception.

Seasons

 
 

 
 
 
 
 
 

 Due to a scoring error during the Notre Dame game in 1936, a game which was originally ruled a 21–20 win for Notre Dame was determined to be a tie when it was discovered Notre Dame had received one more point than they had actually scored. Notre Dame returned to the court to finish the game, but Northwestern refused to return to the court. The Wildcats left the building and the game was deemed a tie.
 Larry Glass left Northwestern after 18 games in 1969. Brad Snyder coached the remaining six games.

Notes

Northwestern
Northwestern Wildcats men's basketball seasons
Northwestern Wildcats basketball seasons